The uterine artery supplies branches to the cervix uteri and others which descend on the vagina; the latter anastomose with branches of the vaginal arteries and form with them two median longitudinal vessels—the vaginal branches of uterine artery (or azygos arteries of the vagina)—one of which runs down in front of and the other behind the vagina.

References 

Arteries of the abdomen